Leody Taveras Salazar (born September 8, 1998) is a Dominican professional baseball outfielder for the Texas Rangers of Major League Baseball (MLB). He made his MLB debut in 2020.

Career
Taveras signed with the Texas Rangers as an international free agent in July 2015, for a signing bonus of $2.6 million. He made his professional debut in 2016 with the Dominican Summer League Rangers and was later promoted to the Arizona League Rangers and Spokane Indians that season. In 73 total games between the three teams, he batted .271 with one home run, 33 RBIs and 18 stole bases. Prior to the 2017 season, Baseball America ranked him as the best prospect in the Rangers system.

Taveras spent the 2017 season with the Hickory Crawdads, where he posted a .249 batting average with eight home runs, 50 RBIs and 20 stolen bases. Taveras spent the 2018 season with the Down East Wood Ducks of the Class A-Advanced Carolina League, hitting .246/.312/.332/.644 with 5 home runs, 48 RBI, and 19 stolen bases in 132 games. Taveras was selected to the 2018 All-Star Futures Game. Taveras was ranked as the #47 overall prospect in baseball by Baseball Prospectus in their preseason 2019 Top 101 list. Taveras was ranked as the #62 overall prospect in baseball by ESPN's Keith Law in his preseason 2019 Top 100 list. Taveras was ranked as the #94 overall prospect in baseball by Fangraphs in their preseason 2019 Top 130 list.

Taveras was assigned back to Down East to open the 2019 season, and hit .294/.368/.376/.745 with 2 home runs and 25 RBI in 66 games for them. On June 20, he was promoted to the Frisco RoughRiders of the Double-A Texas League. With Frisco, Taveras hit .265/.320/.375/.695 with 3 home runs and 31 RBI. Taveras was added to the Rangers 40–man roster following the 2019 season.

2020
Taveras made the Rangers Opening Day roster in 2020. He made his major league debut on July 24, 2020 against the Colorado Rockies. Taveras hit his first career home run on August 29th, 2020 while playing against the Los Angeles Dodgers. He finished the 2020 season hitting .227/.308/.395/.703 with 4 home runs, 6 RBI, and 8 stolen bases over 33 games.

2021
Taveras split the 2021 season between Texas and the Round Rock Express of the Triple-A West. With Texas he hit .161/.207/.270/.477 with 3 home runs, 9 RBI, and 10 stolen bases; with Round Rock he hit .245/.343/.475/.818 with 17 home runs, 55 RBI, and 13 stolen bases.

2022
Taveras once again split a season between Texas and Round Rock in 2022. With Texas he hit .261/.309/.366/.675 with 5 home runs, 34 RBI, and 11 stolen bases; with Round Rock he hit .294/.335/.485/.820 with 7 home runs, 29 RBI, and 7 stolen bases.

References

External links

1998 births
Living people
People from Hermanas Mirabal Province
Dominican Republic expatriate baseball players in the United States
Major League Baseball players from the Dominican Republic
Major League Baseball outfielders
Texas Rangers players
Dominican Summer League Rangers players
Arizona League Rangers players
Spokane Indians players
Hickory Crawdads players
Down East Wood Ducks players
Águilas Cibaeñas players
Frisco RoughRiders players
Round Rock Express players